The Asia/Oceania Zone was one of the three zones of the regional Davis Cup competition in 1994.

In the Asia/Oceania Zone there were three different tiers, called groups, in which teams compete against each other to advance to the upper tier. Winners in Group II advanced to the Asia/Oceania Zone Group I. Teams who lost their respective ties competed in the relegation play-offs, with winning teams remaining in Group II, whereas teams who lost their play-offs were relegated to the Asia/Oceania Zone Group III in 1995.

Participating nations

Draw

 and  relegated to Group III in 1995.
 promoted to Group I in 1995.

First round

Chinese Taipei vs. Malaysia

Singapore vs. Pakistan

Saudi Arabia vs. Iran

Thailand vs. Sri Lanka

Second round

Chinese Taipei vs. Pakistan

Iran vs. Thailand

Relegation play-off

Singapore vs. Malaysia

Sri Lanka vs. Saudi Arabia

Third round

Chinese Taipei vs. Iran

References

External links
Davis Cup official website

Davis Cup Asia/Oceania Zone
Asia Oceania Zone Group II